The TCA Award for Outstanding Achievement in Movies, Miniseries, and Specials is an award given by the Television Critics Association.

Winners and nominees

Total awards by network

 HBO – 16
 PBS – 6
 ABC – 4
 CBS – 2
 FX – 2
 NBC – 2
 A&E – 1
 BBC America – 1
 Discovery Channel – 1
 Hulu — 1
 MTV – 1
 Sci Fi – 1
 Showtime – 1

Total nominations by network 

 HBO – 54
 PBS – 24
 CBS – 20
 ABC – 15
 FX – 11
 NBC – 11
 Netflix - 8
 Showtime – 8
 BBC America – 6
 Hulu - 5
 A&E – 4
 SundanceTV - 4
 Discovery Channel – 3
 HBO Max - 3
 AMC - 2
 Fox - 2
 History - 2
 TNT - 2
 Amazon - 1
 Disney+ - 1
 MTV – 1
 Sci Fi – 1
 Starz - 1

References

External links
 Official website

Movies